Seville is a census-designated place in Tulare County, California, United States. The population was 480 at the 2010 census.

History
Seville was named by officials of the Atchison, Topeka and Santa Fe Railroad in 1913.  First child born in Seville was Dorothy Seville Wilhour on Dec. 21, 1914.  Town gave father $20 gold piece for naming child after town.

A post office was established in Seville in 1915 and was closed in 1931

Geography
According to the United States Census Bureau, the CDP covers an area of 0.6 square miles (1.6 km), all of it land.

Water system
In March 2011, Catarina de Albuquerque of the United Nations visited Seville to evaluate the community's water system. She was appointed by the UN's Human Rights Council in 2008 as the first UN Independent Expert on human rights obligations with respect to access to safe drinking water and sanitation.  She said that many families in Tulare County spend more than 10 percent of their income on tap and bottled water because the tap water is contaminated with nitrates from agricultural fertilizers, septic systems and dairy farms.  De Albuquerque added that this expense cuts into their ability to pay for other essential needs such as "food, housing, education and health."  In Seville, many residents spend more than $120 per month on water while the average annual household income is only $16,000.

Demographics
The 2010 United States Census reported that Seville had a population of 480. The racial makeup of Seville was 200 (41.7%) White, 0 (0.0%) African American, 5 (1.0%) Native American, 0 (0.0%) Asian, 0 (0.0%) Pacific Islander, 259 (54.0%) from other races, and 16 (3.3%) from two or more races. Hispanic or Latino of any race were 458 persons (95.4%).

The Census reported that 480 people (100% of the population) lived in households, 0 (0%) lived in non-institutionalized group quarters, and 0 (0%) were institutionalized.

There were 108 households, out of which 68 (63.0%) had children under the age of 18 living in them, 65 (60.2%) were opposite-sex married couples living together, 17 (15.7%) had a female householder with no husband present, 10 (9.3%) had a male householder with no wife present.  There were 8 (7.4%) unmarried opposite-sex partnerships, and 3 (2.8%) same-sex married couples or partnerships. 7 households (6.5%) were made up of individuals, and 2 (1.9%) had someone living alone who was 65 years of age or older. The average household size was 4.44.  There were 92 families (85.2% of all households); the average family size was 4.51.

The population was spread out, with 178 people (37.1%) under the age of 18, 70 people (14.6%) aged 18 to 24, 128 people (26.7%) aged 25 to 44, 79 people (16.5%) aged 45 to 64, and 25 people (5.2%) who were 65 years of age or older.  The median age was 24.0 years. For every 100 females, there were 123.3 males.  For every 100 females age 18 and over, there were 118.8 males.

The homeowner vacancy rate was 1.8%; the rental vacancy rate was 1.8%.  225 people (46.9% of the population) lived in owner-occupied housing units and 255 people (53.1%) lived in rental housing units.

References

Census-designated places in Tulare County, California
Census-designated places in California